Mayflower is an unincorporated community in Barry County, in the U.S. state of Missouri.

History
A post office called Mayflower was established in 1887, and remained in operation until 1910. The community took its name from the Mayflower, the 17th-century ship.

References

Unincorporated communities in Barry County, Missouri
Unincorporated communities in Missouri